, also known as , was a Japanese statesman, courtier and aristocrat of the early Heian period. He was the first kampaku, a regent of an adult emperor, in Japanese history.

Biography 
He was born the third son of Fujiwara no Nagara, but was adopted by his powerful uncle Fujiwara no Yoshifusa, who had no sons. Mototsune followed in Yoshifusa's footsteps, holding power in the court in the position of regent for four successive emperors.

Mototsune invented the position of kampaku regent for himself in order to remain in power even after an emperor reached maturity. This innovation allowed the Fujiwara clan to tighten its grip on power right throughout an emperor's reign.

Mototsune is referred to as Shōsen Kō (昭宣公) (posthumous name as Daijō Daijin).

Career
 864 (Jōgan 6): Mototsune was named Sangi
 866 (Jōgan 8): Chūnagon
 870 (Jōgan 12, 1st month): He became Dainagon
 872 (Jōgan 14): He was named Udaijin
 876 (Jōgan 18): He was named Sesshō
 880 (Gangyō 4): He was named Daijō Daijin
 884 (Gangyō 8): Mototsune was the first to receive the title Kampaku.
 890 (Kanpyō 2, 14th day of the 12th month): retire from Kampaku
 February 25, 891 (Kampyō 3, 13th day of the 1st month): Mototsune died at the age of 56.

Genealogy
This member of the Fujiwara clan was the son of Fujiwara no Nagara, who was one of the brothers of Fujiwara no Yoshifusa.  Mototsune was adopted as son and heir of Yoshifusa.  In other words, Yoshifusa was Mototsune's uncle, and father through adoption.

He was married to a daughter of Imperial Prince Saneyasu (son of Emperor Ninmyō).

Their children were
 Tokihira (時平) (871–909) – Sadaijin
 Nakahira (仲平) (875–945) – Sadaijin
 Tadahira (忠平) (880–949) – Daijō Daijin, Regent
 Yoriko (頼子) (d. 936), consort of Emperor Seiwa
 Kazuko (佳珠子), consort of Emperor Seiwa
 Onshi (穏子) (885–954), consort of Emperor Daigo, and mother of Emperor Suzaku and Emperor Murakami

He was also married to Princess Sōshi (操子女王), a daughter of Imperial Prince Tadara (son of Emperor Saga).

Their children were
 Kanehira (兼平) (875–935) – Kunai-Kyō (宮内卿)
 Onshi (温子) (872–907), consort of Emperor Uda

His other children were
 Kamiko (佳美子) (d. 898), consort of Emperor Kōkō
 Yoshihira (良平)
 Shigeko (滋子), married to Minamoto no Yoshiari (son of Emperor Montoku)
 daughter, married to Imperial Prince Sadamoto (son of Emperor Seiwa), and mother of Minamoto no Kanetada (源兼忠)

See also
Fujiwara Regents
 Nihon Montoku Tennō Jitsuroku, one of the Six National Histories of Japan; edited by Fujiwara no Mototsune.

Notes

References
 Brinkley, Frank and Kikuchi Dairoku. (1915). A History of the Japanese People from the Earliest Times to the End of the Meiji Era. New York: Encyclopædia Britannica. 
 Hioki, S. (1990). Nihon Keifu Sōran. Kōdansya. (Japanese)
 Kasai, M. (1991). Kugyō Bunin Nenpyō. Yamakawa Shuppan-sha (Japanese)
 Kodama, K. (1978). Nihon-shi Shō-jiten, Tennō. Kondō Shuppan-sha. (Japanese)
 Nussbaum, Louis-Frédéric and Käthe Roth. (2005).  Japan encyclopedia. Cambridge: Harvard University Press. ; 
 Owada, T. et al. (2003). Nihonshi Shoka Keizu Jinmei Jiten. Kōdansya. (Japanese)
 Titsingh, Isaac. (1834). Nihon Ōdai Ichiran; ou,  Annales des empereurs du Japon.  Paris: Royal Asiatic Society, Oriental Translation Fund of Great Britain and Ireland. 

836 births
891 deaths
Sesshō and Kampaku
Fujiwara clan
Regents of Japan
People of Heian-period Japan